Eubank is a home rule-class city in Pulaski and Lincoln counties in southern Kentucky. The population was 319 at the 2010 census.

The Pulaski County portion of Eubank is part of the Somerset Micropolitan Statistical Area, while the Lincoln County portion is part of the Danville Micropolitan Statistical Area. Eubank is the current home of former Detroit Tigers outfielder Josh Anderson and Miss America 1944, Venus Ramey.

History
The town was named for landowner Wesley Eubank and was a stop on the Cincinnati Southern Railroad. It was incorporated by the state assembly in 1886 and is also known as "Eubanks".

Geography
Eubank is located in northern Pulaski County at  (37.279992, -84.657100). A small portion extends north into Lincoln County. The city is concentrated around the intersection of Kentucky Route 1247 and Kentucky Route 70. U.S. Route 27 passes along the city's eastern border, leading south  to Somerset, the Pulaski county seat, and north  to Stanford, the Lincoln county seat. KY 70 leads east  to Mount Vernon and west  to Liberty.

Demographics

As of the census of 2000, there were 358 people, 141 households, and 102 families residing in the city. The racial makeup of the city was 97.77% White, 1.68% Native American, and 0.56% from two or more races.

There were 141 households, out of which 31.2% had children under the age of 18 living with them, 55.3% were married couples living together, 14.9% had a female householder with no husband present, and 27.0% were non-families. 27.0% of all households were made up of individuals, and 14.2% had someone living alone who was 65 years of age or older. The average household size was 2.54 and the average family size was 3.06.

The age distribution was 26.3% under the age of 18, 8.9% from 18 to 24, 29.3% from 25 to 44, 20.9% from 45 to 64, and 14.5% who were 65 years of age or older. The median age was 35 years. For every 100 females, there were 87.4 males. For every 100 females age 18 and over, there were 82.1 males.

The median income for a household in the city was $18,409, and the median income for a family was $19,625. Males had a median income of $26,944 versus $16,667 for females. The per capita income for the city was $15,599. About 22.4% of families and 32.2% of the population were below the poverty line, including 52.9% of those under age 18 and 17.5% of those age 65 or over.

References

External links

Cities in Pulaski County, Kentucky
Cities in Lincoln County, Kentucky
Cities in Kentucky
Danville, Kentucky micropolitan area